The Philadelphia Clef Club of Jazz and Performing Arts, INC. (PCC) is a tax-exempt, non-profit educational and cultural organization. It was founded in 1966 by members of Musicians' Protective Union Local #274, American Federation of Musicians (A F of M).  Local #274 was chartered in 1935 as a separate Black local because Black musicians were denied membership in the racially segregated Local #77.  Local #274 enjoyed its autonomy for more than 36 years.  It was the longest surviving independent Black Musicians' Union in the United States, of the more than fifty chartered in major cities.

Local #274 and PCC's social unit are integral parts of the history of JAZZ in Philadelphia.  They evolved out of the struggle of Black musicians for political, economic, and cultural recognition during Philadelphia's overt segregation period.  Local #274's membership rolls included JAZZ greats like John Coltrane, Dizzy Gillespie, Shirley Scott, Lee Morgan, "Philly" Joe Jones, Grover Washington Jr., the Heath Brothers, and Nina Simone to name a few.

Naming
The word, Jazz, was added to the name of PCC in 1994. The Philadelphia Clef Club of Jazz & Performing Arts, Inc. made history when it opened the doors of its new facility in October 1995.  The facility was the first ever designed and constructed specifically to be a Jazz institution.   The concept of a Jazz Art Institution is a new one, because Jazz has been traditionally presented and developed in the commercial sector through bars, clubs, concert halls, and the recording industry.   It is Philadelphia's only major music institution solely devoted to this great American art form.  The Clef Club's vision is to have the broad community embrace, and support JAZZ as a great American Art Form, understand its roots in the African American experience, and recognize Jazz as central to our national cultural heritage, and worthy of public and Institutional support.

The mission of the Philadelphia Clef Club of Jazz & Performing Arts, Inc. is to celebrate and preserve the legacy of jazz through accessible education for the Greater Philadelphia region, and to support the evolving art form through talent development, programming, and public performance.   We wish to accomplish this goal through promoting the development of talent and providing opportunities for the growth of the performing artist specifically, with a special emphasis in instrumentalists.   We seek to serve the artist and the community through providing a forum for the listening and appreciation of the great American Art Form of Jazz and related disciplines.  We also wish to promote the academic exchange of information related to Jazz through educational programs.   Finally, The Clef Club will be a depository to collect and preserve the history of jazz music for further research and interpretation by scholars, educators, artists, and the general public.

The programs of the Philadelphia Clef Club of Jazz & Performing Arts. Inc. include: The Philadelphia Clef Club Youth Ensemble,  Jazz Master Workshops, Youth Summer Jazz Camps, Student Ensemble Education Programs, Music Workshops in-school programs, Jazz Cultural Voices and The Preservation Jazz Series concert series.

In the near future, the implementation of senior citizen outreach programs consisting of instrumental instruction (individual and group), and vocal activities (individual and group).  And also the association of the Philadelphia Clef Club of Jazz & Performing Arts, Inc. with all types of community groups including other JAZZ organizations, churches, schools, and community centers in the Greater Philadelphia/Delaware Valley area.

References

External links
 
 Philadelphia Clef Club of Jazz and Performing Arts records at the Philadelphia Clef Club of Jazz and Performing Arts
 Nels Nelson clippings files on jazz at the Philadelphia Clef Club of Jazz and Performing Arts

Culture of Philadelphia
Organizations based in Philadelphia
American Federation of Musicians
Music venues in Philadelphia
Jazz clubs in Philadelphia
1966 establishments in Pennsylvania